Aeroflot Flight 5143 was a domestic scheduled Karshi–Ufa–Leningrad passenger flight that crashed near Uchkuduk, Uzbek SSR, Soviet Union, on 10 July 1985. The crash killed all 200 occupants (148 adults, including 9 crewmembers, and 52 children) on board. Investigators determined that crew fatigue was a factor in the accident.

Flight 5143 remains the deadliest air disaster in Soviet and Uzbek aviation history, the deadliest in Aeroflot's history, and the deadliest accident involving a Tupolev Tu-154.

Aircraft 
Flight 5143 was operated by a Tupolev Tu-154B-2, registration CCCP-85311. It was produced in 1978 at Aviakor, an aircraft factory in Samara.

Crew 
Flight 5143 was piloted by 48 year old Oleg Pavlovich Belisov. Throughout his career, Belisov logged 12,283 hours, 3,390 of them on the Tu-154. The co-pilot, 48 year old Anatoly Timofeevich Pozyumsky, logged 12,323 hours, 1629 of them on the Tu-154. The crew also consisted of a navigator, 41 year old Garry Nikolaevich Argeev, and a flight engineer, 32 year old Abduvakhit Sultanovich Mansurov. 5 flight attendants were also onboard.

Accident
The low speed caused vibrations, which the aircrew incorrectly assumed were engine surges. The aircraft stalled and entered a flat spin, crashing into the ground near Uchkuduk, Uzbekistan, at that time in the Soviet Union. There were no survivors.

Investigation
Flight 5143's cockpit voice recorder was destroyed in the crash. Investigators, with the help of psychologists, studied the human factors that led to the accident. They found Flight 5143's flight crew were very fatigued at the time of the crash from having spent the prior 24 hours at the departure airport prior to takeoff. Another factor was inadequate regulations for crews encountering abnormal conditions.

See also

Aeroflot accidents and incidents
Aeroflot accidents and incidents in the 1980s

References

Aviation accidents and incidents in 1985
Airliner accidents and incidents caused by pilot error
Aviation accidents and incidents in the Soviet Union
Aviation accidents and incidents in Uzbekistan
5143
Accidents and incidents involving the Tupolev Tu-154
1985 in the Soviet Union
July 1985 events in Asia
Airliner accidents and incidents caused by stalls
1985 disasters in the Soviet Union